Lake City High School (LCHS) is a public high school in Lake City, Michigan, United States. It serves  grades 9–12 for the Lake City Area Schools.

Demographics 
The demographic breakdown of the 370 students enrolled in 2018-19 was:
 Male - 48.6%
 Female - 51.4%
 Native American - 0.5%
 Asian - 0.5%
 Black - 0.5%
 Hispanic - 4.9%
 White - 90.0%
 Multiracial - 3.5%

See also 
 List of high schools in Michigan
 List of local education agency districts in Michigan

References

External links 

Public high schools in Michigan
Missaukee County, Michigan
Education in Missaukee County, Michigan